Lapassalan Jiravechsoontornkul (born 7 December 1994 as Wiraporn), nicknamed Mild, also known by the pseudonym WJMild, is a Thai actress. She is best known as Maewnam in the 2015 Thai television series Ugly Duckling Series: Don't, which became one of the most viewed teen drama in Thailand. She is one of the most popular television stars in her country.

Filmography

Film

Television Series

Ads 
 Farmhouse
 Penny Wafer Roll

References

External links

1994 births
Living people
Lapassalan Jiravechsoontornkul
Lapassalan Jiravechsoontornkul
Lapassalan Jiravechsoontornkul
Lapassalan Jiravechsoontornkul
Lapassalan Jiravechsoontornkul